This page shows a list of military weapons and vehicles used by the Afghan National Army up until December 2016.

Infantry weapons and equipment

Handguns

Automatic rifles

Sniper rifles

Machine guns

Grenade-based weapons

Rocket-based weapons

Armoured vehicles

Unarmoured vehicles

Other vehicles
 International 7000-MV
 Tata Motors SK1613/SE1615/SE1615TC 4½ ton trucks (50+)
 Mercedes-Benz Actros
 Volvo FMX
 2½ ton trucks
 Family of Medium Tactical Vehicles
 Ambulances
 various platforms including Humvee, Unimog, Ford Ranger and other pickups
 Other Technicals of various origins:
 Ford Ranger LTV pickups
 Toyota pickup trucks
 BTS-4 Armoured Recovery Vehicle
 Bridge Laying Vehicles:
 MTU-20
 MTU-72
 BTM-3 Mine Clearing Vehicle
ScanEagle unmanned aerial vehicle

References

Equipement
Military equipment of Afghanistan
Afghanistan
Equipment